Javier "Javi" Martínez Aginaga (born 2 September 1988) is a Spanish professional footballer who plays as a defensive midfielder or central defender for Qatar Stars League club Qatar SC.

He arrived at Athletic Bilbao in 2006, before his 18th birthday, quickly imposing himself as a starter and going on to appear in 251 official games over the course of six La Liga seasons, scoring 26 goals. In 2012, he signed with Bayern Munich for €40 million, going on to win nine consecutive Bundesliga titles as well as the UEFA Champions League in 2013 and 2020.

A former Spain international, Martínez was a member of the squads that won the 2010 FIFA World Cup and UEFA Euro 2012, and also played at the 2014 FIFA World Cup.

Club career

Athletic Bilbao
Martínez was born in Estella, Navarre and raised in the nearby village of Ayegui; and was a promising basketball player in his youth. Athletic Bilbao signed him as a raw 17-year-old for €6 million in the summer of 2006, from fellow La Liga club CA Osasuna, despite him never having played a game with the first team; he had scored three goals in 32 appearances for the reserve team.

Martínez soon became a regular in his debut season with powerful displays, his highlight being scoring twice against Deportivo de La Coruña in a 2–0 away success on 16 December 2006, and finished with 35 games and three goals. He was ever-present again over the following two years, helping Athletic to the final of the Copa del Rey in 2009.

In 2009–10, Martínez was the midfield engine once more– 46 official matches, nine goals – and netted a career-best six times in the league campaign as the side narrowly missed on another qualification to the UEFA Europa League. In 2011–12, under new manager Marcelo Bielsa, he began to be used regularly as a central defender, making 50 starts in the demanding role and receiving three red cards during the latter season, which saw them reach another domestic cup final as well as the decisive game in the Europa League, only to lose both matches 3–0.

Bayern Munich

2012–13 season
On 29 August 2012, after Bayern Munich paid the buyout clause of €40 million in his contract, Martínez signed a five-year contract with the German club. He thus became the transfer record in the 50-year history of the Bundesliga. Martínez made his official debut on 2 September – the day of his 24th birthday – coming on as a 77th minute substitute for Bastian Schweinsteiger in a 6–1 home win over VfB Stuttgart. He scored his first goal for his new club against Hannover 96 on 24 November, netting the opener in an eventual 5–0 home triumph through a bicycle kick.

Martínez scored his second goal for Bayern in their 6–1 demolition of Werder Bremen on 23 February 2013, heading home from an Arjen Robben free-kick to make the score 2–0 after thirty minutes. Following the team's impressive 4–0 victory over FC Barcelona in the first leg of their UEFA Champions League semi-final clash on 23 April, he was lauded by many pundits for his all-around display and was credited as the key man in breaking up the tiki-taka football of national teammates Xavi and Andrés Iniesta; in the final game of his first season, he netted the first goal as the club came back from 0–2 and 1–3 down to win it 4–3 at Borussia Mönchengladbach. He finished the season with three goals in 43 appearances.

2013–14 season

Martínez started the 2013–14 campaign on the substitutes bench, under new manager Pep Guardiola. On 30 August 2013, in that year's UEFA Super Cup, he took the pitch early into the second half of the match against Chelsea, and scored the 2–2 equalizer in the last minute of extra time, as the Bavarians went on to win the trophy in Prague after a penalty shootout. Martínez finished the season with one goal in 34 appearances.

2014–15 season
On 13 August 2014, Martínez tore the ligaments on his left knee 30 minutes into the German Super Cup encounter against Borussia Dortmund (eventual 0–2 loss), going on to miss the vast majority of the season. He returned to action on 2 May 2015, starting in central defence in a 2–0 league defeat of Bayer 04 Leverkusen. Ten days later, he came on as an 87th-minute substitute in the Champions League semi-final second leg against Barcelona. In addition to playing in the German Super Cup, Martínez also played in one Bundesliga match and one Champions League match.

2015–16 season
Martínez made his first appearance of 2015–16 on 19 September 2015, featuring 24 minutes and being booked in a 3–0 win at SV Darmstadt 98. His first start of the campaign came as a stopper in a 3–0 defeat of 1.FSV Mainz 05, the following matchday.

On 4 October 2015, Martínez played 90 minutes for the first time in one year and five months, in a 5–1 Klassiker win against Borussia Dortmund. On 18 December he signed a new contract, keeping him at the club until 2021. He finished the season with a goal in 27 appearances.

2016–17 season
Martínez started the 2016–17 season by playing in the German Super Cup. Martínez finished the season with two goals in 37 appearances.

2017–18 season
Martínez started the 2017–18 season by playing in the German Super Cup. On 31 October 2017, Martínez scored the winning goal in a 2–1 away victory over Celtic during the Champions League group stage, which confirmed his team's passage to the knockout phase. In the process, he sustained a cut to his face in a clash of heads with Nir Bitton; it was his first ever goal in European competitions, in 59 appearances. Martínez finished the season with two goals in 37 appearances.

2018–19 season
Martínez started the 2018–19 season by winning the German Super Cup as Bayern defeated Eintracht Frankfurt with a 5–0 victory. On 19 January 2019, following a 3–1 win over Hoffenheim, he reached 100 Bundesliga wins with Bayern Munich in his 120th appearance for the club, breaking the record previously held by Arjen Robben, who took 126 matches.

On 18 May 2019, Martínez won his seventh consecutive Bundesliga title as Bayern finished two points above Dortmund with 78 points. A week later, Martínez won his fourth DFB-Pokal as Bayern defeated RB Leipzig 3–0 in the 2019 DFB-Pokal Final. He finished the season with four goals in 33 appearances.

2019–20 season
He made a total of 24 appearances in the 2019–20 treble-winning season.

2020–21 season
On 24 September 2020, Martínez (at that time heavily linked in the media with a return to Athletic Bilbao) scored in extra-time to win the 2020 UEFA Super Cup for Bayern Munich with a 2–1 victory over Sevilla; it was his second goal in two appearances in the UEFA Super Cup.  Having scored the decisive goal once again in the extra time for Bayern as he did earlier in 2013 against Chelsea in the UEFA Super Cup final, he famously earned the nickname of "Mr. Super Cup" (later made famous in the sports media) from his teammate Thomas Müller who became man of the match. On 4 May 2021, Bayern announced that Martínez would be leaving Bayern at the end of the season, since both parties agreed not to extend his contract.

Qatar SC
On 20 June 2021, Martínez signed for Qatar Stars League club Qatar SC.

International career

At the age of 19, Martínez began appearing for Spain's under-21 team, representing the nation at the 2009 UEFA European Championships in Sweden, in a group stage exit. On 20 May 2010, he was named in the senior side's list of 23 for the FIFA World Cup in South Africa, by manager Vicente del Bosque. On the 29th he made his full debut, replacing FC Barcelona's Xavi in the 74th minute of a 3–2 friendly win against Saudi Arabia, in Innsbruck, Austria; on 3 June he started in another exhibition game, with South Korea (1–0 triumph, in the same venue), playing 80 minutes until David Silva took his place.

Martínez played once in the final stages, replacing the injured Xabi Alonso for the final 20 minutes of the group stage 2–1 win against Chile on 25 June, as Spain emerged victorious in the tournament. He returned to the under-21 setup for the 2011 European Championships in Denmark, captaining the nation to its third title in the category.

Martínez also appeared in one game at UEFA Euro 2012 for the eventual champions, again substituting Alonso midway through the second half, this time against the Republic of Ireland in the group stage (4–0 success). He was described by del Bosque as "a complete player", with the manager comparing him to Patrick Vieira; additionally, he was part of the squad at the 2012 Summer Olympics, which ended in group phase elimination.

Martínez was named in Spain's 30-man provisional squad for the 2014 FIFA World Cup, as well as the final 23-man squad for the tournament. He made his tournament debut in the second group game, starting against Chile in the Maracanã in place of Gerard Piqué in a 0–2 loss that confirmed elimination for the Europeans.

Style of play
Martínez is a versatile player who can play both as a holding midfielder and as a centre-back; he is also capable of playing as a sweeper in a three-man back-line in a 3–4–3 or 3–5–2 formation, due to his ability to play the ball out from the back. His versatility enabled Bayern Munich's effective adoption of a flexible tactical approach under manager Pep Guardiola, allowing the team to switch between different formations throughout the course of a single match. In addition to his good tackling, physical power, ability in the air, and defensive awareness, Martínez has also stood out for his passing ability, technique, and vision, as well as his strong mentality, which also enable him to play in a variety of midfield roles, including as a deep-lying playmaker. Ahead of Euro 2012, The Globe and Mail described Martínez as "a silky yet combative player."

Personal life
Martínez's older brother, Álvaro, was also a footballer, who played as a defender. Having played mainly in the lower leagues, he had a brief spell in the second division with SD Eibar.
Javi has cited Álvaro as being a positive influence over his early career.

In addition to his native Spanish, Martínez also speaks German and English.

Career statistics

Club

International
Source:

Honours

Club
Athletic Bilbao
UEFA Europa League: Runner-up 2011–12
Copa del Rey: Runner-up 2008–09, 2011–12

Bayern Munich
Bundesliga: 2012–13, 2013–14, 2014–15, 2015–16, 2016–17, 2017–18, 2018–19, 2019–20, 2020–21
DFB-Pokal: 2012–13, 2013–14, 2015–16, 2018–19, 2019–20
DFL-Supercup: 2016, 2017, 2018, 2020
UEFA Champions League: 2012–13, 2019–20
UEFA Super Cup: 2013, 2020
FIFA Club World Cup: 2013

International
Spain
FIFA World Cup: 2010
UEFA European Championship: 2012
FIFA Confederations Cup: Runner-up 2013

Spain U21
UEFA European Under-21 Championship: 2011

Spain U19
UEFA European Under-19 Championship: 2007

Individual
La Liga Breakthrough Player of the Year: 2010
2011 UEFA European Under-21 Championship Team of the Tournament

References

External links

 Bayern official profile
 
 
 
 
 
 
 

1988 births
Living people
People from Estella Oriental
Spanish footballers
Footballers from Navarre
Association football defenders
Association football midfielders
Association football utility players
CD Izarra footballers
CA Osasuna B players
Athletic Bilbao footballers
FC Bayern Munich footballers
Qatar SC players
Segunda División B players
La Liga players
Bundesliga players
Qatar Stars League players
UEFA Champions League winning players
Spain youth international footballers
Spain under-21 international footballers
Spain under-23 international footballers
Olympic footballers of Spain
Spain international footballers
Basque Country international footballers
2010 FIFA World Cup players
UEFA Euro 2012 players
Footballers at the 2012 Summer Olympics
2013 FIFA Confederations Cup players
2014 FIFA World Cup players
FIFA World Cup-winning players
UEFA European Championship-winning players
Spanish expatriate footballers
Spanish expatriate sportspeople in Germany
Spanish expatriate sportspeople in Qatar
Expatriate footballers in Germany
Expatriate footballers in Qatar